Paul Fletcher may refer to:

 Paul Fletcher (footballer) (born 1951),  retired English professional footballer
 Paul Fletcher (politician) (born 1965), Liberal member of the Australian House of Representatives
 Paul Fletcher (theologian) (1965–2008), English Roman Catholic philosophical theologian and lecturer
 Paul Fletcher (baseball) (born 1967), American baseball player
 Paul J. Fletcher, US Air Force officer